Herbert Theodore Milburn or H. Ted Milburn (May 26, 1931 – April 1, 2016) was a United States district judge of the United States District Court for the Eastern District of Tennessee and later a United States Circuit Judge of the United States Court of Appeals for the Sixth Circuit.

Education and career
Born in Cleveland, Tennessee, Milburn graduated from Chattanooga City High School in 1949. He received a Bachelor of Science degree from East Tennessee State University in 1953 and was in the United States Army Security Agency from 1953 to 1956. He received a Juris Doctor from the University of Tennessee College of Law in 1959, and was in private practice in Chattanooga, Tennessee from then until 1973. He was a judge on the Circuit Court of Hamilton County, Tennessee, Division III from 1973 to 1983.

Federal judicial service
Milburn was nominated by President Ronald Reagan on April 14, 1983, to a seat on the United States District Court for the Eastern District of Tennessee vacated by Judge Charles Gelbert Neese. He was confirmed by the United States Senate on June 6, 1983, and received commission on June 7, 1983. He served as Chief Judge from January 15, 1984 to October 9, 1984. His service terminated on October 9, 1984, due to elevation to the Sixth Circuit.

Milburn was nominated by President Reagan on September 6, 1984, to the United States Court of Appeals for the Sixth Circuit, to a new seat authorized by 98 Stat. 333. He was confirmed by the Senate on October 3, 1984, and received commission on October 4, 1984. He assumed senior status due to a certified disability on July 1, 1996. His service terminated on April 1, 2016, due to death.

Death
Milburn died on April 1, 2016, at the Alexian Village Retirement Community, in Signal Mountain, Tennessee.

References

Sources
 

1931 births
2016 deaths
20th-century American judges
East Tennessee State University alumni
Judges of the United States Court of Appeals for the Sixth Circuit
Judges of the United States District Court for the Eastern District of Tennessee
People from Cleveland, Tennessee
Tennessee state court judges
United States Army personnel
United States court of appeals judges appointed by Ronald Reagan
United States district court judges appointed by Ronald Reagan
University of Tennessee College of Law alumni
People from Signal Mountain, Tennessee